Miles City is a city in and the county seat of Custer County, Montana, United States. The population was 8,354 at the 2020 census.

History

After the Battle of the Little Bighorn in 1876, the U.S. Army created forts in eastern Montana, including one where the north-flowing Tongue River flowed into the east-flowing Yellowstone River. The first fort was known as the Tongue River Cantonment or the Tongue River Barracks and was founded on August 27, 1876. A second, permanent fort was constructed on higher ground two miles to the west of the mouth of the Tongue and this became Fort Keogh.

Fort Keogh (named after Captain Myles Keogh, one of the battle dead, whose horse, Comanche, was the lone survivor of Custer's command) started as a few rough winter cabins, but grew into a moderate sized western fort, from which its commander, General Nelson A. Miles, effectively brought the remaining "uncontrolled" Native Americans into subjugation during the last decade of the 1800s.

Nelson Miles said that "whiskey caused him more trouble than the Indians" and, after tiring of drunken soldiers causing problems during the winter campaign, evicted the sutlers who provided "liquid stock" in the spring of 1877. Moving two miles due east of the Tongue River Cantonment, these early merchants founded the first Miles City. Although fondly referred to as "Milestown," the first post office and first official plat both called the town "Miles City." When the old cantonment moved two miles west, the town literally picked up and followed, moving to the current site. The last occupants of Old Miles City stayed on until 1900 but the new community was the one that grew.

Before the town itself was founded, George Miles, the nephew of General Miles, who had accompanied his uncle on the western expedition and served in the quartermasters office, bought a herd of sheep, the first of many commercial enterprises in his involvement with the core founders of the town.

Livestock speculation brought thousands of cattle to the open ranges in the late 1880s, the railroad was extended through the area, and Texas drove numerous cattle to Miles City to fatten them on free grass and move them to where they could be loaded on trains bound for the slaughterhouses in Chicago (Milwaukee Railroad).

The City of Miles City was incorporated in 1887 and the first mayor was Eugene Henry "Skew" Johnson (born July 27, 1846, in Clarksville, Arkansas, died July 31, 1919, in Miles City, Montana) who served for one term.

Miles City established a municipal electric utility around 1887 and it was a source of civic pride (as any city would have towards its own utilities) until a traveling employee of Minnesota Northern Power (predecessor of MDU Resources Group, Inc.) told the city council "the emperor has no clothes;" i.e., the system was far less efficient and in worse shape than they thought. The city council eventually put the question to the voters who instructed the city to sell the utility. By this time, the people with the Montana Power Company (now NorthWestern Energy's Montana division) became aware of this and were soon locked in an epic battle with Minnesota Northern over the franchise. A franchise election was held to determine who would serve Miles City on June 28, 1927. Minnesota Northern won by a scant 16 votes.

Miles City experienced rapid growth until the 1920s and 1930s, but became overshadowed by the upstart upriver town of Billings, which was at the cross roads of transportation routes. Billings became a banking center, oil refining center, and medical service center and is now the largest city in the state.

Notably, it was the site of an early scheduled airline crash, involving Northwest Airlines Flight 1, which caught fire and crashed shortly after takeoff in January 1939.

Geography
Interstate 94 passes through the community, with access from Exits 135, 138, and 141. Montana Highway 59 runs north–south. The Tongue River flows into Yellowstone River at the town. Pirogue Island State Park is just outside of town.

Climate
The city holds the record for the highest mean sea level pressure in the contiguous United States with a reading of 31.42 inHg (1064 mb) on December 24, 1983.

According to the Köppen Climate Classification system, Miles City has a cold semi-arid climate, abbreviated "BSk" on climate maps.

Giant snowflake
Guinness World Records reports that the largest natural snowflake ever measured,  in diameter, was recorded at Fort Keogh on January 28, 1887. However, there is no corroborating evidence to support this claim.

Demographics

2010 census
As of the census of 2010, there were 8,410 people, 3,677 households, and 2,082 families living in the city. The racial makeup of the city was 95.3% White, 0.3% African American, 1.7% Native American, 0.4% Asian, 0.1% Pacific Islander, 0.6% from other races, and 1.6% from two or more races. Hispanic or Latino of any race were 2.4% of the population.

There were 3,677 households, of which 27.5% had children under the age of 18 living with them, 42.0% were married couples living together, 10.3% had a female householder with no husband present, 4.3% had a male householder with no wife present, and 43.4% were non-families. 37.2% of all households were made up of individuals, and 15% had someone living alone who was 65 years of age or older. The average household size was 2.20 and the average family size was 2.89.

The median age in the city was 40.6 years. 22.4% of residents were under the age of 18; 9.4% were between the ages of 18 and 24; 22.7% were from 25 to 44; 27.6% were from 45 to 64; and 17.8% were 65 years of age or older. The gender makeup of the city was 48.8% male and 51.2% female.

2000 census
As of the census of 2000, there were 8,487 people, 3,528 households, and 2,194 families living in the city. The population density was 2,593.3 people per square mile (1,002.1/km2). There were 3,890 housing units at an average density of 1,188.7 per square mile (459.3/km2). The racial makeup of the city was 96.72% White, 0.12% African American, 1.39% Native American, 0.28% Asian, 0.05% Pacific Islander, 0.44% from other races, and 1.00% from two or more races. Hispanic or Latino of any race were 1.59% of the population.

There were 3,528 households, out of which 29.7% had children under the age of 18 living with them, 47.7% were married couples living together, 10.8% had a female householder with no husband present, and 37.8% were non-families. 32.3% of all households were made up of individuals, and 13.1% had someone living alone who was 65 years of age or older. The average household size was 2.31 and the average family size was 2.93.

In the city, the population was spread out, with 24.6% under the age of 18, 8.8% from 18 to 24, 25.9% from 25 to 44, 22.5% from 45 to 64, and 18.2% who were 65 years of age or older. The median age was 39 years. For every 100 females, there were 92.3 males. For every 100 females age 18 and over, there were 87.7 males.

The median income for a household in the city was $29,847, and the median income for a family was $41,190. Males had a median income of $30,123 versus $18,750 for females. The per capita income for the city was $16,449. About 9.4% of families and 14.7% of the population were below the poverty line, including 17.7% of those under age 18 and 8.5% of those age 65 or over.

Media
The Miles City Star is the town's newspaper.

Radio stations

 KATL (AM 770) – Adult Contemporary
 KMTA (AM 1050) – Oldies
 KIKC (AM 1250) – Oldies
 KYPR (FM 90.7) – NPR station
 KYUS-FM (92.3 FM) – Adult Hits
 KIKC-FM (101.3 FM) – Country music

Events

1944 ice jam 
In March 1944, an ice jam on the Yellowstone River caused flooding which reached into Miles City. After unsuccessful attempts to clear the jam using local resources, help was requested from the Army Air Corps by the Montana governor. A B-17 bomber was dispatched from nearby Rapid City, South Dakota and cleared the ice jam using 250-pound bombs.

Annual bucking horse sale 
The largest event of the year is the Miles City Bucking Horse Sale held in May. Miles City is also home to the Eastern Montana Fair and is the commercial hub of southeastern Montana. The sale is generally held regardless of weather.

Education
Miles Community College was founded in 1939. The current average student to faculty ratio is 11:1; class sizes range from 8 to 50 students; and over 85% of the students qualify for financial aid. Miles Community College also features free tutoring at the Center for Academic Success. The Judson H. Flower, Jr. Library is located within the main building of Miles Community College, and is equipped with computer lab and INFOTRAC.

Much of the population's livelihood involves agriculture – entirely or in part; therefore, the National FFA Organization (Future Farmers of America) organization is very active and about 20% of the student population belong to it. The school is famous for its Chorale, which travels extensively including a trip to Carnegie Hall in NYC in 2005 and a trip to Washington D.C. in 2007. The school boasts that its seniors have an average ACT score of 23 and that 57% of the graduating seniors go on to complete their education at a 4-year university.

Miles City also has 4 elementary schools, Lincoln (3-6), Highland Park (k-2), Jefferson (k-2), Garfield (1-6) and a middle school, Washington School (7 and 8). Washington Middle School boasts many extra curricular activities, including sports, builder's club and student council. There is also one parochial school, Sacred Heart (pre K-8).

Miles City Public Library serves the area.

Places of interest
Woodruff Park provides picnic opportunities in the Pine Hills east of town on the road to Baker (Hwy 12). Spotted Eagle recreation area provides picnic, fishing, swimming, and hiking. Also on the Baker road, but much closer to town, just past the Interstate, are the Strawberry Hills, good for short hikes and climbs. The highest point in the vicinity is Signal Butte ( above sea level), said to have been used by Native Americans for communication, but used for decades by radio and sometimes TV antennas. Signal Butte lies at the edge of an area of badlands, a striking arid vista of eroded sedimentary soil, sporting multi-colored layers exposed by the erosion. The land contains sandstone formations in the midst of sagebrush and cedar trees growing in a soil that turns to gumbo when wet. Airport Hill is the elevated bluff of the north bank of the Yellowstone River, and Paragon Pit is a remote area of the north bank opposite of Fort Keogh frequented by teenagers over the years. 12 Mile Dam spans the Tongue River and attracts teens in the summer for water sport. Being shallow, the Tongue River is often used for tubing. The former Fort Keogh once boasted an Air Force radar station and still houses a state Extension Experiment Station. Near the highway is the site of a state fish hatchery, and nearby, a double humped butte is known locally as "Camelback". Miles City lies at the mouth of the north flowing Tongue River as it empties into the eastward flowing Yellowstone River. Both rivers are fished regularly, but yield mostly catfish, carp and a junk fish known locally as "shiners". Many local reservoirs are stocked with edible fish from the hatchery in Miles City.

Trinity Lutheran Church
There are 21 places of worship in Miles City. Trinity Lutheran Church was founded in 1906 as a preaching station with German services and served by missionaries following on the newly built Northern Pacific Railroad to hold services for German settlers in Miles City. During the anti-German hysteria of WWI, preaching in German was outlawed in Montana, including for worship at Trinity, Miles City. Now it is an English-speaking congregation in the Montana District of the Lutheran Church Missouri Synod (LCMS). It also operates a school.

Notable people

 Walter A. Burleigh, non-voting delegate to the United States House of Representatives from the Dakota Territory
Noelle E. Cockett, geneticist and president of Utah State University
 Emily Danforth, professor and author of The Miseducation of Cameron Post
 Caleb Frare, professional baseball pitcher
 Maurice Hilleman, microbiologist
 Elmer Holt, tenth governor of Montana
 George Lynch, race car driver
 Jeff Meyer, television director
Merle Greene Robertson, art historian and renowned scholar of the pre-Columbian Maya civilization.
 Curt Schmidt, Montreal Expos pitcher
 James Arnold von der Heydt, lawyer and judge of the United States District Court for the District of Alaska
 Larry R. Williams, commodity trader, author, and father of Academy Award-nominated actress, Michelle Williams
 George Winston, pianist

References

External links

 City website
 Community website 
 The Miles City Star
 The Miles City Live HD Camera
 1944 Bombing of Miles City

 
Cities in Montana
Cities in Custer County, Montana
County seats in Montana